Alban Joseph Riley (8 June 1844 – 24 July 1914) was an Australian politician. He was mayor of the City of Sydney and a Member of the New South Wales Legislative Assembly.

Early life 
On 4 October 1870 he married Eleanor Harriett Birkenhead, the second daughter of William and Hannah Birkenhead, at Sydney.

In 1878 he visited India, Palestine, Europe and England. He established an export drapery business, AJ Riley & Co, with branches in London, Paris and Sydney. His private residence was Tulloona, in Gloucester Avenue, .

Politics 

Riley was a Burwood alderman in 1884. He served on Sydney City Council from 1885 to 1891 and was mayor in 1887. He first stood for the New South Wales Legislative Assembly at the 1885 election for Canterbury, but was unsuccessful by a margin of 133 votes (0.8%). In 1887 he was elected to the Legislative Assembly as a Free Trade member for South Sydney, finishing at the head of the poll, but was defeated in 1889 with a swing to the Protectionists. Appointed to the New South Wales Legislative Council in 1891, he was forced to resign in 1893 when he was declared bankrupt. He was alleged to have continued trading and obtaining credit despite his bankruptcy.

Later life 
He was buried in Rookwood Cemetery on 26 July 1914.

Legacy 
The Corn Exchange built in 1887 has his name and that he was mayor in 1887 over the corner door.

References

External links

 

1844 births
1914 deaths
Members of the New South Wales Legislative Assembly
Free Trade Party politicians
Mayors and Lord Mayors of Sydney
Members of the New South Wales Legislative Council